Peter Alldridge is a British lawyer and currently Drapers Professor of Law at Queen Mary University of London and Fellow of the Academy of Social Sciences.

References

Year of birth missing (living people)
Living people
Academics of Queen Mary University of London
English lawyers